1987–88 was the 41st and final season of the Western International Hockey League.

Standings
 Cranbrook Royals     (14-7-1-29)
 Elk Valley Blazers    (7-14-1-15)	
 Kimberley Dynamiters  (7-15-0-14)

Elk Valley Blazers won the playoffs and were awarded the Savage Cup.

References 

Western International Hockey League seasons
WIHL